The 2004 Atlantic Coast Conference men's basketball tournament took place from March 11–14 in Greensboro, North Carolina, at the Greensboro Coliseum. The Maryland Terrapins won the tournament as the #6 seed, upsetting #3 seed Wake Forest, #2 seed NC State, and top seed Duke in succession on their way to the championship. It was Maryland's third tournament title, and their first since 1984. Maryland's John Gilchrist won the Most Valuable Player award. Maryland's championship ended Duke's streak of five straight ACC championships.

The 2004 ACC Tournament was the final event with nine participating teams. Virginia Tech and University of Miami from the Big East Conference joined the ACC for the 2004–2005 season.

Bracket

* Denotes overtime game

AP Rankings at time of tournament

External links
 

Tournament
ACC men's basketball tournament
College sports in North Carolina
Basketball competitions in Greensboro, North Carolina
ACC men's basketball tournament
ACC men's basketball tournament